Vincent Fournier (born 13 September 1961) is a retired Swiss football defender.

Honours

Player
FC Sion
Swiss Cup: 1981–82, 1985–86

References

1961 births
Living people
Swiss men's footballers
FC Sion players
FC Zürich players
Association football defenders
Swiss Super League players
Switzerland under-21 international footballers